

List of rulers of Tlôkwa

Territory located in present-day Botswana.

Kgôsikgolo = Paramount Chief

See also
Botswana
Heads of state of Botswana
Heads of government of Botswana
Colonial heads of Botswana (Bechuanaland)
Rulers of baKgatla
Rulers of baKwêna
Rulers of Balete (baMalete)
Rulers of baNgwaketse
Rulers of Bangwato (bamaNgwato)
Rulers of baRôlông
Rulers of baTawana
Lists of office-holders

External links
www.uq.net.au/~zzhsoszy/states/southafrica/batlokwa.html

Botswana chiefs